Arenillas Canton is a canton of Ecuador, located in the El Oro Province.  Its capital is the town of Arenillas.  Its population at the 2001 census was 22,477.

Demographics
Ethnic groups as of the Ecuadorian census of 2010:
Mestizo  84.4%
White  5.4%
Afro-Ecuadorian  4.7%
Montubio  4.7%
Indigenous  0.5%
Other  0.2%

References

Cantons of El Oro Province